Wu Lei (born December 26, 1999), also known as Leo Wu, is a Chinese actor. He is known as the "China's Little Brother" in China. 

He made his first appearance in commercials at the age of three. In 2007, officially made his debut in acting as Nezha for the series, The Legend and the Hero. Additionally, he is known for his supporting roles in Nirvana in Fire and The Whirlwind Girl (2015) and his starring roles in Fight Breaks Sphere (2018) and The Long Ballad (2021) and Love like The Galaxy (2022).

In 2011, he won Best Young Actor at the 28th Flying Apsaras Awards for his role in Mo's Mischief. In 2016, he was nominated for Best Newcomer at the 19th Huading Awards for his role Nirvana in Fire. In 2018, he ranked first place in the country on the entrance examination to the Beijing Film Academy.

Wu ranked 63rd on Forbes China Celebrity 100 list in 2017, 29th in 2019 and 47th in 2020.

Early life and education 
Wu Lei was born in Shanghai, China on December 26, 1999.

In 2018, Wu entered Beijing Film Academy, the largest film institution in Asia, placing first on the entrance examination with an impressive score of 92.85 and a total score of 456.

Career

Pre-debut; 2006–2012: Beginnings and acting debut
Wu Lei was first scouted when he was 3. Thereafter, Wu appeared in the commercial of Chinese dietary supplement brand Huang Jin Da Dang in 2002. His adorable grin became a beloved trademark, further launching him in the showbiz industry. Subsequently, he was featured in more than fifty commercials and made minor appearances in numerous shows for the next two years. 

He took on his first scripted role in the Chinese television drama, The Young Warriors (2006), as the young Yang Yanzhao. That same year, he began his first professional training into acting. During one of the classes, a director came to scout for young actors/actresses. Coincidentally, Wu was in the restroom and almost missed the scouting. Determined to not miss this opportunity, he raced after the leaving crew, after which his photo was finally taken. To his surprise, he was chosen, and subsequently made his debut in The Legend and the Hero (2007) where he portrayed Nezha. 

Wu first gained attention for his roles in the children television dramas Home with Aliens (2009) and Naughty boy Xiaotiao Ma (2010), for which he won the Outstanding Child Actor award at the Flying Apsaras Awards. He further raised his profile with his role in wuxia drama Little Heroes (2012).

Despite his young age, he established his talent for acting through his unprecedented gregariousness and versatility. By the age of 10, he has already appeared in twenty to thirty shows.

2014–present: Rising popularity and transition to lead roles
In 2014, Wu featured in Romance of the Condor Heroes produced by Yu Zheng, a wuxia drama remake of Jin Yong's novel, The Return of the Condor Heroes, and received acclaim for his portrayal of young Yang Guo.

In 2015, Wu starred as Li Xiaoyao in the web drama Pal Inn and endorsed the video game of the same name. The series gained over 300 million views, and became a popular topic online. This was followed by well-received supporting role in youth sports drama The Whirlwind Girl and historical drama Nirvana in Fire, which led to increased recognition for Wu. Additionally, he displayed his charisma and quick-thinking during a press  conference for The Whirlwind Girl by making a joke to deescalate an awkward question regarding him and his co-actress, Tan Songyun.

In 2017, Wu took on his first small screen leading role in the fantasy web drama, Magic Star. He also co-starred in the British-Chinese action thriller S.M.A.R.T. Chase directed by Charles Martin; as well as Chinese-New Zealand production Into the Rainbow. 

In 2018, Wu starred in the fantasy epic Asura. Then he was also starred in the fantasy adventure series The Tomb of Sea, written by the author of Daomu Biji; and Battle Through the Heavens, a fantasy action drama based on the popular xianxia novel of the same name. The same year, he was featured in historical film Shadow by acclaimed director Zhang Yimou. Forbes China listed Wu under their 30 Under 30 Asia 2017 list which consisted of 30 influential people under 30 years old who have had a substantial effect in their fields. In 2019, Wu starred in the romance film Adoring.

In 2020, Wu starred in the historical fantasy drama Guardians of the Ancient Oath, and esports drama Cross Fire.

In 2021, Wu starred in the acclaimed historical drama, The Long Ballad, alongside Dilraba Dilmurat and was highly praised for his portrayal, which further boosted his popularity. The same year, he was featured in coming-of-age film Upcoming Summer by Leste Chen,  drama Our Times which depicts China in early 1990s and war film Windriders by Wu Jing (actor) in My Country, My Parents.

In 2022, he starred in the historical romance drama  Love like The Galaxy alongside Zhao Lusi, based on the novel, "Xing Han Can Lan, Xing Shen Zhi Zai" by Guan Xin Ze Luan. Wu was cast in the film Dwelling by the West Lake by Gu Xiaogang, the film All Ears by Liu Jiayin, and the metropolitan romance drama Nothing but You.

Face injury on set 
While filming a scene on set in August of 2021, a prop malfunctioned and exploded in Wu's face. He insisted that the injuries were minor and continued after a brief treatment. Only after filming that day did he head to the hospital. There, it was revealed the numerous wounds left on his face from the shrapnel, some of which almost ending up in his eyes. He has made a recovery since then.

Filmography

Film

Television series

Variety show

Variety Show Guest Appearances

Discography

Awards and nominations

Forbes China Celebrity 100

References

External links

1999 births
Living people
Male actors from Shanghai
Chinese male film actors
Chinese male television actors
21st-century Chinese male actors
Chinese male child actors
Beijing Film Academy alumni